The statue of Saint Wenceslas is an outdoor sculpture by Johann-Georg Bendl from 1680, installed at Vyšehrad, Prague, Czech Republic. The statue formerly stood in the middle of Wenceslas Square, near Grandhotel Evropa, but was moved to Vyšehrad in 1879.

References

External links

 

17th-century sculptures
Equestrian statues in the Czech Republic
Monuments and memorials in Prague
Outdoor sculptures in Prague
Sandstone sculptures
Sculptures of men in Prague
Statues in Prague
Wenceslas